Dorothy Deborah Wegman Raphaelson (November 24, 1904 – November 7, 2005), known professionally as Dorshka, was an American dancer, Ziegfeld Girl, vaudeville performer, and novelist.

Early life 
Dorothy Deborah Wegman was raised in the Washington Heights neighborhood of New York City. Her parents were immigrants from Eastern Europe. She had a sister Esther and a brother Daniel; their mother was Pasha Wegman, and their father was an engineer.

Career 
Dorothy Wegman left high school to work full-time after her father's death. She worked for a clothing manufacturer while auditioning for stage roles. She danced in The Whirl of New York (1921), Bombo (1922), Topics of 1923 (1923–1924), Big Boy (1925), No Foolin''' (1926), and Rio Rita (1927–1928). She left Rio Rita and retired from the stage when she eloped.

Raphaelson wrote two published novels: Glorified (1930), based on her time as a dancer, and Morning Song'' (1948), which was also autobiographical.

Personal life 
Dorothy Wegman married writer Samson Raphaelson in late 1927. They had a son, Joel (born 1928), and a daughter, Naomi (1930–2009). She was widowed when Samson Raphaelson died in 1983. She died in 2005, aged 100 years, in New York; at the time of her death, she was believed to be the second-to-last surviving Ziegfeld Girl. Her husband's papers, archived at the University of Illinois, includes a taped interview with Dorothy Wegman Raphaelson.

References

External links 

 
 
 
 A photograph of Dorothy Wegman by Alfred Cheney Johnston, in the collection of the Library of Congress.

20th-century American dancers
1904 births
2005 deaths
American women novelists
Ziegfeld girls
20th-century American novelists
20th-century American women writers
People from Washington Heights, Manhattan
Writers from Manhattan
Novelists from New York (state)
Dancers from New York (state)
American centenarians
Women centenarians
21st-century American women